Krukira is a Miskito Indian fishing community in the North Caribbean Coast Autonomous Region of Nicaragua.

Hurricane Felix
The area had extensive damage from Hurricane Felix in 2007, and the village was in the path of the eye of the hurricane. According to official information, at least 9,000 houses were destroyed, leaving many of the 40,000 people in the area homeless.  Most of those affected lived in Krukira and Bilwi (Puerto Cabezas). The government declared a "State of Disaster" in the area, which suffered a total lack of supplies and services as a result of the storm.

Gallery

References

Populated places in Nicaragua
North Caribbean Coast Autonomous Region